Wayne John Patchett is an Australian Paralympic athlete. At the 1976 Toronto Games, he won a gold medal in the Men's Discus 1A event and a silver medal in the Men's Shot Put 1A event. At the 1980 Arnhem Games, he won three gold medals in the Men's Club Throw 1A, Men's Discus 1A, and Men's Shot Put 1A events. In 2000, he received an Australian Sports Medal.

References

Paralympic athletes of Australia
Paralympic gold medalists for Australia
Paralympic silver medalists for Australia
Athletes (track and field) at the 1976 Summer Paralympics
Athletes (track and field) at the 1980 Summer Paralympics
Medalists at the 1976 Summer Paralympics
Medalists at the 1980 Summer Paralympics
Paralympic medalists in athletics (track and field)
Recipients of the Australian Sports Medal
Year of birth missing (living people)
Living people
Australian male discus throwers
Australian male shot putters
Paralympic discus throwers
Paralympic shot putters
Wheelchair discus throwers
Wheelchair shot putters